The 2006–07 Segunda Divisão season was the 73rd season of the competition and the 57th season of recognised third-tier football in Portugal.

Overview
The league was contested by 56 teams in 4 divisions with SC Freamunde, União Funchal, CD Fátima and Real winning the respective divisional competitions and progressing to the championship playoffs.  The overall championship was won by SC Freamunde and the runners-up CD Fátima were also promoted to the Liga de Honra.

League standings

Série A

Série B

Série C

Série D

Championship playoffs

Semi-finals

Final
The final was played on 26 May 2007 in Anadia.

Footnotes

External links
 Portuguese Division Two «B» – footballzz.co.uk

Portuguese Second Division seasons
Port
3